Oregon Connections Academy is a tuition–free K–5 online public school affiliated with the Prairie City School District in Prairie City, Oregon, United States.  The school is operated by Oregon Connections Academy, a nonprofit corporation, through a contract with Connections Academy of Oregon, LLC, to provide its educational program and other services. The school is governed by an independent board of directors, and all board meetings are open to the public.

School profile
Oregon Connections Academy, which opened in 2020, is a full-time, tuition-free, K–12 online public school.

Academics

The academic record of Connections Academy in other states was called "spotty" by The Oregonian in 2005, comparing the 1:50 teacher:student ratio to the 1:20 ratio of the Clackamas Web Academy.

Location 
The academy office is located in an office in Prairie City, Oregon.   Since the school is online, the physical location is largely a matter of formality, and does not reflect the physical location of the school's servers, instructors, etc.  The school lists the location as its administrative office.

References

Online schools in the United States
Education in Linn County, Oregon
Public elementary schools in Oregon
Public middle schools in Oregon
Public high schools in Oregon
Charter schools in Oregon
Online K–12 schools